Pakistan Military Academy, also referred to by its acronym PMA, is an officers training centre located near Kakul village in the city and district of Abbottabad, Khyber Pakhtunkhwa established in October 1947. It is the sole service academy in Pakistan tasked with training cadets into serving as army officers. For educational training, the institution is accredited by NUST.

Cadets have to go through 2 years of rigorous military training until they can be termed an officer. Pakistan Military Academy provides training to Gentlemen Cadets (Officer Cadets) of Pakistan Army and Allied countries. The academy has four training battalions, and 16 companies. Approximately 2,000 invited guests from over 34 countries visit this institution each year. Many close allies of Pakistan send their own cadets and officers to receive premier training in modern military doctrine at PMA.

Former COAS Gen Raheel Shareef, inaugurated 4th Pakistan Battalion in PMA on October 10, 2016.

History

Before the dissolution of British India in 1947, the location had initially been used as the premises of a Physical Training and Mountaineering School of the British Indian Army, on the site of a vacant POW camp set up in 1902 for just a few months for prisoners from the Boer War, and later it became a dwelling-operating space of the Royal Indian Army Service Corps. After the division of the old Indian Army between India and Pakistan in 1947, Brigadier Francis Ingall, an officer of the British Indian Army, was selected by the C-in-C India, Field Marshal Sir Claude Auchinleck, as first commandant of the Pakistan Military Academy, who selected the vacant location at Kakul for a military academy. He determined that the PMA would be organized based upon the model established by Sandhurst and requested a regimental sergeant major from the Brigade of Guards to help with training. He was fortunate to have the support of a number of old Indian Army officers who were transferred to the Pakistan Army, among them Lieutenant-Colonel Attiqur Rahman, Major S.G. Mehdi M.C., the first PMA adjutant and founder of Qasim company, who later went on to command the SSG (Special Service Group) of the Pakistan Army. In spite of facilities which were comparably sparse to those of the Indian Military Academy at Dehra Dun, Ingall won the confidence of his cadets and instructors. When, late in 1947, the dispute over the accession of Jammu and Kashmir led to armed conflict between India and Pakistan, Ingall was able to structure the Academy’s training to enable newly-commissioned officers to be immediately effective when they joined units on active service. Ingall was appointed OBE after completing his term as commandant in 1950. What probably gave him more satisfaction was the decision to name Kakul’s central lecture theatre Ingall Hall - though this was not built until many years after he had left. He kept in touch with the academy for the rest of his life, making his last visit in November, 1997 where he said:

A total of sixty-seven cadets (66 Muslims and 1 Christian cadet) arrived from IMA on 15 October 1947 and new cadets for Ist PMA Long Course (78) and Ist Graduates Course (63) were selected in Pakistan and training started officially in January 1948. Two hundred and eight cadets started their training in January 1948. On January 25, 1948, "The First Pakistan Battalion" was instituted. This battalion has four companies which were "named after the luminaries of Muslim military history" (e.g., Khalid, Tariq, Qasim, and Salahuddin). In March 1948, the First Battalion "was bestowed with Quaid-e-Azam’s patronage as Colonel-in-Chief, and the most coveted claim “The Quaid-e-Azam’s Own".

Khawaja Nazimuddin gave the Quaid-e-Azam banner to the Pakistan Military Academy on behalf of Quaid-e-Azam Mohammed Ali Jinnah. The Quaid-e-Azam banner is held aloft by the champion company at every passing out parade. "Regimental colours presented in 1950 by Liaquat Ali Khan, the first Prime Minister of Pakistan and the National Standard in 1961 by General Muhammad Musa, the then-Commander-in-Chief of the Pakistan Army, have been some of the honours showered on the Academy, which it has always zealously guarded and kept high in letter and spirit."

The 1965 war led to expansion of the Academy, and the second battalion of the Academy was created in December 1965.  This battalion consisted of four companies, called Ghaznavi, Babur, Aurangzeb, and Tipu.  In early 1989, the third battalion of the Academy was founded. The third battalion's four companies are Haider, Ubaida, Saad, and Hamza.

Educational philosophy
The academy offers a two-year undergraduate program leading to the Bachelors in Military Art and Science (BMAS) including some common subjects as English, Military Geography, National and International Affairs, Islamic Studies, Military and General Science or Social Science. The long course cadets study two years for the degree before commissioning and completing their degree in their units. Every Gentleman Cadet passing out of the academy has a minimum graduation (from MCE, CEME, MCS, AM College or civil institutes) except for Long Course cadets who complete their degree after graduation.

The academy believes in proper discipline of a cadet and proper induced discipline. It is based on the principles of Discipline, Honor, Patriotism and the qualities are strictly monitored. Cadets are made to look at current world affairs and ammunition, with subjects being taught in relation to or from the perspective of military operations and history. Cadets are also strongly encouraged to uphold/exalt officer traditional code of conduct in order to mold cadets into being exemplary Army Officers by the end of their term. Communication skills are given great importance and courteousness and consistency are kept a record of and stressed upon. Cadets are provided with modern educational facilities and are equipped with modern labs to bolster learning. A cadet is also trained to react during stress situations and his overall mental capability is worked on.

War tactics are presented to cadets and are part of the curriculum. These include discussion of previous war models and ones to anticipate. Cadets are also given navigation training in equipped map rooms and then overall judged in the tactical exercises without troops and professionalism are judged in weapon training areas.

Physical requirements 
GCs (Gentlemen Cadets) are required to pass various physical tests. The academy has very high physical standards, which all cadets have to achieve in order to pass. The physical requirements increase with promotion to the next term. The basic requirement for cadets of first term is to be able to complete one mile run (1.6 kilometers) in six minutes and thirty seconds. In second term, cadets are required to complete one mile run in six minutes and fifteen seconds. For third term cadets one mile time is six minutes and for fourth term cadets i.e. the senior most cadets are required to run one mile within six minutes. Other tests includes push ups, sit ups, chin up, rope test, five mile running, assault course, and the acid test. These tests generally test the stamina and strength of a cadet.

In the "acid test," cadets begin by traversing a mountain while carrying logs on their shoulders. This is followed by a 14.5 km run in full gear to an obstacle course. Those completing the course are given five rounds with which to hit a target at a distance of 22m.

Lady Cadets are also required to pass physical efficiency tests like GCs, but the standards are bit less keeping in view to their physique. The basic requirement for all lady cadets is to run one mile (1.6 km) within ten minutes. Other tests includes push ups, sit ups, bar hanging, assault course and also undergoes an exercise Qiyadat with GCs.

There are a number of training exercises for cadets, which include:
 First term: Kick Off, Saluting Tests, Cross Country, Sang e Bunyad, Yarmuk, Path Finder and the GCs are required to spend three minutes in the Boxing Ring with another opponent following a lengthy training period.
 Second term: T.M Raiders, Panipat and Assault Course is also added as a part of PT Tests. Qiyadat and the  Acid Test.

Battalions 
For the sake of training, the Gentlemen Cadets are organized in battalions and then further into companies. There are 16 companies in Pakistan Military Academy, all of them are named after famous Muslim warriors and commanders.

1st Pakistan Battalion (Quaid-I-Azam's own)
1st Pakistan Battalion consists of four companies:

 Khalid
 Tariq
 Qasim
 Salahuddin

2nd Pakistan Battalion (Quaid-i-Azam's own)
2nd Pakistan Battalion consists of four companies:

 Ghaznavi 
 Babar
 Aurangzeb
 Tipu

3rd Pakistan Battalion (Quaid-i-Azam's own)
3rd Pakistan Battalion consists of four companies:

 Haider
 Ubaida
 Saad
 Hamza

4th Pakistan Battalion (Quaid-i-Azam's own) 
4th Pakistan Battalion consists of four companies:
 Akram 
 Karnal Sher Khan
 Aziz Bhatti
 Shabbir Sharif

Courses
There are five courses (or curricular plans) running parallel to each other. The courses are:

PMA Long Course 
The PMA Long Course is for regular commission officers of combat and combat support arms & services. The Long Course has a duration of two years, which is further divided into four terms of six months each. After the 2-year training period Cadets pass out as 2nd Lieutenants.

Technical Cadet Course (TCC) 
Candidates who wish to join the army as an engineer apply for this course. It is necessary that candidates have attained 12 years of academic education with Physics, Chemistry and Mathematics courses. Candidates who are successful in all tests conducted for selection are then sent to a NUST institution for a Bachelor of Engineering degree, depending on the field they choose:

After completing their Bachelor of Engineering degree from one of these courses of study, the E-Cadets, as they are called, are sent to Pakistan Military Academy, Kakul for military training of one year after which they directly attain the rank of captain in their respective units.

Integrated Course (IC) 
To be eligible for this course, a candidate must have attained 16-18 years of academic education with coursework in Physics, Chemistry and Biology. Candidates who pass initial and GHQ Selection Board tests conducted by the army are sent to Army Medical College for MBBS or for Bachelor of Dental Surgery after which they go through a Basic Military Training at Pakistan Military Academy, Kakul for 22 weeks. Apart from GCs of AM College, IC accepts cadets who will to join EME, Signals, RVFC and Army Education Corps with minimum masters in different fields. The IC has a duration of six months. Cadets graduate as Captains. This course includes all the essential components required for commissioning as an officer apart from the boxing and acid test.

PMA Lady Cadet's Course (LCC) 
The PMA Lady Cadet's Course was first started in November 2006. The course is taken by masters and bachelors-qualified ladies who are sound professionals in their fields. The lady cadets undergo a training period of six months and pass out as Captains in supporting arms of the Pakistan Army.

Mujahid Course (MC) 
The Mujahid course was first started in 2011. This course is taken by those candidates who are twice-declared low merit from PMA long course. The Mujahid Course cadets go under the training of one year at PMA, Kakul and pass out 2nd Lieutenants. They mostly serve in Kashmir area near LOC, and the area near the border with India. The headquarter of Mujahid Regiment is in Bhimber, Kashmir.

List of Commandants

Notable alumni
 General Asim Munir, Chief of Army Staff (Pakistan)
 General Qamar Bajwa, former Chief of Army Staff (Pakistan)
 General Raheel Sharif, former Chief of Army Staff (Pakistan)
 General Ashfaq Parvez Kayani, former Chief of Army Staff (Pakistan)
 General Pervez Musharraf, former Chief of Army Staff and President of Pakistan
 General Jehangir Karamat, former Chief of Army Staff (Pakistan) and Ambassador to the US
 General Abdul Waheed Kakar, former Chief of Army Staff (Pakistan)
 General Asif Nawaz Janjua, former Chief of Army Staff (Pakistan)
 General Mirza Aslam Beg, former Chief of Army Staff (Pakistan)
 Col. S.G. Mehdi, M.C, first Group Commander of the SSG (Special Services Group). Founding first PMA Adjutant in Aug 1947. Founder Company Commander, Qasim Company.
 Major M A Hamza [Tamghag-e-Imtiaz] [Tamghag-e-Jurrat]
 Major Malik Mohammad Habib Khan (PSP)] Federal Minister for Interior &  Inspector General of Police - 37 PMA (Pakistan)
 Major Shabbir Sharif [Nishan-e-Haider]
 Major Muhammad Akram [Nishan-e-Haider]
 Captain Karnal Sher Khan, NH
 Major Aziz Bhatti, NH
 General Rahimuddin Khan, Gentleman Cadet No. 1, former Chairman of the Joint Chiefs of Staff Committee.
 Brigadier Tariq Mehmood, SJ
 General Srilal Weerasooriya, former Commander of the Sri Lanka Army and Ambassador to Pakistan
 General Muhammad Aziz Khan, former Chairman Joint Chiefs of Staff and Chief of General Staff
 General Ahsan Saleem Hayat, former Vice Chief of Army Staff
 General Ehsan ul Haq, former Chairman Joint Chiefs of Staff
 General Tariq Majid, former Supreme Commandant of the Pakistan Defense Forces and Chairman of the Joint Chiefs of Staff
 Colonel Aqeel Ahmed (colonel), SI(M), psc, MSc. Corps of EME,  Secretary Heavy Industries Taxila Board.
 Major General K.M Shafiullah, Bangladesh Army's first chief in 1972
 Lieutenant General Ziaur Rahman, President and Chief of Army Staff, Bangladesh
 Colonel Shafaat Jamil, Brigade Commander of 46th Independent Brigade in the early 1970s, Bangladesh Army
 Major General Khaled Musharraf, Chief of Army Staff, Bangladesh Army
 Lieutenant General Hasan Mashhud Chowdhury, Chief of Army Staff, Bangladesh Army
 Major General Tunde Idiagbon, former Chief of Staff, Supreme Headquarters (de facto Vice President of Nigeria) from 1983 to 1985

Gallery

See also 

National Defence University 
Military academies in Pakistan

References

Pakistan Military Academy
Military installations in Khyber Pakhtunkhwa
Educational institutions established in 1947
1947 establishments in Pakistan
Pakistan federal departments and agencies
Abbottabad District